The Bulatmai barbel (Luciobarbus capito) is a species of ray-finned fish in the genus Luciobarbus from the Aral and Caspian basins, including rivers that flow into these.

Footnotes 
 

Capito
Fish described in 1773
Taxa named by Johann Anton Güldenstädt